Philologus of Sinope (also Philologos) is numbered among the Seventy Disciples, and is commemorated with them on January 4.  He is also commemorated on November 5 together with Ss. Patrobas, Hermas, Linus, and Gaius.

The Apostle Andrew consecrated St. Philologos (Romans 16:15) as bishop of Sinope, a city in the region of the Black Sea.

He was the father of heretic and founder of Marcionism Marcion of Sinope.

Hymns
Troparion (Tone 3)
Holy apostle Philologus of the Seventy;
Entreat the merciful;
To grant our souls forgiveness of transgressions.
Kontakion (Tone 4)
The Church ever sees you as a shining star, O apostle Philologus,
Your miracles have manifested great enlightenment.
Therefore we cry out to Christ:
"Save those who with faith honor Your apostle, O Most Merciful One."

References

Sources
Apostle Philologus of the Seventy, January 4 (OCA)

External links
Apostle Philologus of the Seventy, November 5 (OCA)

Seventy disciples
Saints from Roman Anatolia
People from Sinop, Turkey
Christian saints from the New Testament
1st-century Christian saints
1st-century bishops in Roman Anatolia